The Mercedes-Benz W108 and W109 are luxury cars produced by Mercedes-Benz from 1965 through to 1972 (or 1973 in North America). The line was an upgrade of the Mercedes-Benz W114/W115, to succeed the W111 and W112 fintail sedans. The cars were successful in West Germany and in export markets including North America and Southeast Asia. During the seven-year run, a total of 383,361 units were manufactured.

Since the W108 and W109 were only available as 4-door models, similarly squarish 2-door W111 and W112 coupés and cabriolets, without pronounced tailfins, filled those niches and are frequently mistaken for W108/109 two-doors.

Model history

The car's predecessors, the Mercedes-Benz W111 (1959–71) and W112 (1961–67), helped Mercedes-Benz develop greater sales and achieve economy of scale production, reducing both manufacture time and cost. Throughout the 1950s, Mercedes-Benz had been producing the coachwork 300 S and 300 SL and all but hand-built 300 Adenauers alongside conveyor assembled Pontons (190, 190 SL and 220) etc. Unifying the entire Mercedes-Benz range into the fintail reduced production onto a single automobile platform.

However, fashion trends in the early 1960s changed rapidly. By the time the Paul Bracq-designed 2-door coupé and cabriolet W111s were launched, the predecessor W111 sedan's fins lost their chrome trim and sharp appearance.  The arrival of the W113 'Pagoda' coupé and cabriolet in 1963 saw them further buried into the trunk's contour.  Finally, they disappeared completely on the W100 600 in 1963.

The evolution of the W111 began under the leadership of Bracq in 1961 and ended in 1963. Although the fins' departure was the most visible change, the W108 had a lower body waist line and increased glass area - the windscreen alone was 17% larger than W111's - prominent enough to be referred to as a "greenhouse". The cars had a 60 mm lower ride and 15 mm wider doors. The result was a visibly newer-looking, sleeker car with an open and spacious interior.

Differences between W108 and W109
Due to the success of long wheelbase 300 SE Lang (W112), which was intended as an interim car between 300 "Adenauer" (W189) and "Grosser Mercedes" 600 (W100), Mercedes-Benz continued to offer two wheelbase lengths for W108/W109. Initially, the wheelbase lengths denoted W108 (standard) and W109 (long). For 1968 model year, this distinction changed with the introduction of 280 SEL that retained W108, rather than W109, chassis designation.

The larger 3-litre six-cylinder inline engine (300 SEL) were exclusive to W109 with odd exception of standard wheelbase 300 SEb (1965–1967), which was designated as W108. The smaller six-cylinder inline engines (250 S/SE and 280 S/SE/SEL) were assigned to W108 only. Both eventually received the V8 engines in 1967 (W109) and 1970 (W108).

W109 was more luxuriously appointed than W108, featuring burled walnut dashboards, automatic transmission, and power windows along with optional air conditioning system. Most obvious distinction from the W108 were door window frames and a-pillars fully finished with polished metal bright trim.

The W108 and W109 had different types of suspension systems: W108 retained the steel coil springs and oil-filled shock absorbers while W109 used the self-levelling air suspension.

First Series, 1965–1967

The W108/W109 premiered at the Frankfurt Auto Show in 1965. The initial model range consisted of three W108s (250 S, 250 SE, and 300 SEb) and a sole W109 (300 SEL). The inline-six engines were carried over from the previous generation with mechanical refinements. The 2.2-litre M180 engine was enlarged to 2.5 litres while the fuel-injected 3-litre M189 version was carried over from "300 Adenauer".

The 250 S was fitted with 2,496 cc M108 engine with dual two-barrel downdraft carburettors producing  at 5,400 rpm. The 250 SE had the same engine as 250 S except for fuel injection system and different engine designation (M129).

Both 300 SEb and 300 SEL were fitted with 2,966 cc M189 engine. The engine was an updated version of M186, originally developed in 1951 for Type 300 "Adenauer", with Bosch mechanical fuel-injection system that calibrated the optimal fuel mixture automatically based on throttle pedal position and movement, engine speed, atmospheric pressure, water temperature, and driving conditions.

The production figures for the first series from 1965 to 1967 showed 129,858 of 250 S/250 SE and 5,106 of 300 SEb/300 SEL. The tiny production figure of 300 SEb/300 SEL reflected the higher sales price with luxurious appointments, exclusivity, and smaller global market share.

300 SEL 6.3

In 1966 company engineer Erich Waxenberger transplanted a massive 6.3 L Mercedes-Benz M100 V8 from the company's flagship 600 (W100) into a W109 chassis, creating the first Q-car from Mercedes-Benz.

Second Series, 1967–1972

To coincide with the launch of new cheaper executive, W114/115 "/8" (Stroke Eight) models, slotted below MB's W108 and W109, the inline six engine range was revised in 1967. The 2.5-litre engine was enlarged to 2,778 cc (2.8 litres) and renamed as M130 for both carburetted and fuel injected  versions.

250 S and 250 SE were renamed as 280 S and 280 SE in November 1967 while 250 S was still offered in some export markets until March 1969. In January 1968, a long wheelbase variation, 280 SEL, was introduced for the first time.

The standard wheelbase 300 SEb was dropped while 300 SEL 2.8 obtained 2.8-litre engine with higher output , replacing the M186 engine.

Following the strong reception of limited production V8-powered 300 SEL 6.3 in 1967, Mercedes-Benz offered the all-new 3.5-litre M116 V8 engine with new Bosch D-Jetronic electronic fuel injection in 1969. The V8 engine would move W108/W109 further upmarket in many export markets and allow them to be more competitive in the United States where many passenger vehicles, especially the American luxury marques, were fitted with V8 engines. The new  V8 engine was first fitted to W109 in August 1969 as 300 SEL 3.5 then to W108 in July 1970 as 280 SE/SEL 3.5.

The 3.5-litre V8 engine was bored out to 4,520 cc (4.5 litres) as to compensate for the loss of power following the changes in emission control regulations and due to lower fuel octane rating in the United States. The larger V8 engine was designated as M117 and had the same output figures as 3.5-litre V8 engine. It was initially exclusive for the United States, introduced in the spring of 1971, as the 280 SE/SEL 4.5 and the 300 SEL 4.5, until the new, 1973 model year W116, MB's first generation of distinct S-Class platform 450 SE/SEL models, which went on sale worldwide in September 1972, alongside the V8 powered 350/450 SL (R107) 2-seat cabrios and the 350/450 SLC (C107) 4-seat luxury coupes.

The 300 SEL 2.8 was dropped in January 1970 since the 300 SEL 3.5 was selling better and had better performance. The production of 280 SEL ended in April 1971, leaving 280 S and 280 SE as sole models with six-cylinder inline engines until the end of W108/W109 production in 1972, following the introduction of W116.

Transmission
The standard transmission for Europe was a four-speed manual gearbox. A four-speed automatic option was also available. Unusual among mainstream European automakers of the time, Mercedes developed and built their own automatic transmission system. A five-speed manual gearbox was offered for six-cylinder inline engines only from 1969 to 1972, though a few customers opted for it.

When the 3.5-litre V8 engine was introduced in 1969, the sole transmission choice was a four-speed automatic with fluid coupling. The customers could request the four-speed manual transmission with price reduction if they inclined so. As for 4.5-litre V8 engine for the United States, the transmission was three-speed automatic with torque converter.

Models

W108

W109

Timeline

Technical info

See also
 Mercedes-Benz S-Class, for a complete overview of all S-Class models

References

Notes

Bibliography

General

Workshop manuals

External links

Curbside Classic: 1966 Mercedes 250S (W108) – Cadillac Und Lincoln Kaput – a retrospective of the W108
Mercedes Benz W108 website
W108/W109 Tom's Mercedes Benz 108/109 Resource Site
RollHard - 1972 Mercedes Benz 280SE

W108
Cars introduced in 1965
1970s cars
Limousines